Joseph Pernell Johnson (born December 21, 1962) is a former American football wide receiver in the National Football League for the Washington Redskins and the Minnesota Vikings.  He played college football at the University of Notre Dame.

1962 births
Living people
Players of American football from Washington, D.C.
American football wide receivers
Notre Dame Fighting Irish football players
Washington Redskins players
Orlando Thunder players
Minnesota Vikings players